Injustice is the absence or opposite of justice.

Injustice may also refer to:

 Injustice (British TV series)
 Injustice (Malaysian TV series)
 InJustice, a 2011 documentary about lawyers manipulating class action lawsuits
 Injustice (franchise), a franchise based on the fictional universe of DC Comics
 Injustice: Gods Among Us, 2013, the first game in the series
 Injustice: Gods Among Us (comics), a comics prequel to the first game
 Injustice 2, a 2017 sequel of the first game
 Injustice 2 (comics), a comics sequel to the second game
 Injustice (2021 film), a 2021 animated film in the Injustice franchise, based on the Year One comics
 Injustice (professional wrestling), professional wrestling stable in MLW

See also
 Justice (disambiguation)
 In Justice, a 2006 American police procedural television series
 Injustice League, one of two fictional supervillain groups
 Justice League: Injustice for All, a 2002 video game
 Injustice Society, a fictional supervillain group